Cambodia–Turkey relations are the foreign relations between Cambodia and Turkey. Diplomatic relations at the legation level were established in 1947 and then to the rank of ambassador in 1959. It was not until 2013, however, that Turkey established a resident embassy in Cambodia's capital, Phnom Penh.

Diplomatic relations 

The two countries did not have diplomatic relations at the ambassadorial level until 2013. Part of the reason was the close relations that King Sihanouk developed with North Korea. Turkey, as a close ally to South Korea, refrained from fostering relations with the King who maintained his private residence in Pyongyang that was built for him by the president of North Korea, Kim Il-sung, in the 1970s. Relations improved after the dissolution of the Soviet Union, when Cambodia started engaging with noncommunist states.

Presidential visits

Economic relations 
Trade volume between the two countries was US$108.4 million in 2015 (Turkish exports/imports: 3.7/94.7 million USD).

See also 

 Foreign relations of Cambodia
 Foreign relations of Turkey

References

External links 
 Library of Congress / Federal Research Division / Country Studies / Area Handbook Series/ Cambodia / Bibliography

Turkey
Cambodia